Hilton Grand Vacations Inc. is based in Orlando, Florida, United States, with regional offices located in Las Vegas, Nevada, Oahu, Hawaii, New York City, Marco Island, Florida and Sanibel Island, Florida. It was formerly a wholly owned subsidiary of Hilton Inc. (formerly Hilton Worldwide) until it was spun off into a publicly traded company. As of December 31, 2019, it has 55 properties with 8,916 rooms in 5 countries and territories, all franchised.

Dealing in timeshares, Hilton Grand Vacations Company, LLC develops, manages, markets, and operates a system of brand-name vacation club ownership resorts. Resort villas are jointly owned by members who have exclusive use of the properties for limited periods of time (also known as timeshares). Club members can also exchange their intervals for vacations at affiliated resorts worldwide. Various timeshare websites report timeshare owner critiques of the HGVC property experience.

History 

A year after investing, HNA Group was in talks to sell some or all of its 25% share in Hilton Grand Vacations, a timeshare business which had spun off from Hilton Worldwide Holdings the year before.

Hilton Grand Vacation announced its intention to acquire Diamond Resorts International on March 10, 2021 for $1.4 billion. The acquisition was completed on August 2nd.

Hilton Grand Vacation Club
The Hilton Grand Vacation Club (HGVC) is a timeshare-point-based reservations and exchange system allowing HGVC members leisure-travel opportunities. There are currently more than 300,000 HGVC members worldwide. Club membership provides exclusive exchange, leisure-travel, and reservation services.

Right of first refusal 
HGVC retains the right of first refusal for most of its properties. When selling an HGVC account, each owner is required to submit their purchase agreement contract to Hilton. Hilton may decide to exercise ROFR to purchase the subject property, thus refusing the sale to the original buyer. Some of the properties without ROFR are HGVC at the Flamingo, The Bay Club at Waikoloa Beach Resort, and most affiliate resorts.

Similar programs
Diamond Resorts International
Disney Vacation Club
Westgate Resorts
Bluegreen Corporation

Properties

References

External links 
 Hilton Grand Vacations consumer website
 Hilton Grand Vacations corporate and investor relations website

Grand Vacations Company
Hospitality companies established in 1992
Timeshare chains
Companies based in Orlando, Florida
The Blackstone Group companies